Greg Naylor (born 30 August 1957) is  a former Australian rules footballer who played with Richmond in the Victorian Football League (VFL).

Notes

External links 
		

Living people
1957 births
Australian rules footballers from Victoria (Australia)
Richmond Football Club players
People educated at Wesley College (Victoria)